Societe Generale bank Montenegro (full name: Societe Generale Montenegro AD, MNSE: POBA) was a bank operating in Montenegro. Founded in 1906 as Podgorička banka (Bank of Podgorica), it offered services in corporate and retail banking. The bank provides a range of depository and lending services, which include checking accounts, savings accounts, money market accounts, commercial loans, consumer loans and construction, mortgage loans, safety deposit boxes, VISA credit cards, Western Union services and an ATM network.

The bank conducted its services through a network of 20 branches - seven in and around Podgorica, as well as one in each of the following towns: Danilovgrad, Cetinje, Ulcinj, Bar, Budva, Kotor, Tivat, Igalo, Nikšić, Kolašin, Bijelo Polje, Berane and Rožaje.

In December 2005, French banking group Société Générale acquired a majority stake in Podgorička banka for €14 million.

The bank has changed its name to Societe Generale Bank Montenegro on May 25, 2012. In February 2019, Societe Generale Montenegro was sold to OTP Bank (Hungary) and became Podgorička banka.  On December 11, 2020, the final absorption of Podgorička banka by Crnogorska komercijalna banka is effective, thus combining the two Montenegrin subsidiaries of the OTP group into a single entity.

References

Sources
Official Site
Njegoskij Fund Network: La Société Générale prend le contrôle de Podgoricka Banka a.d. (fr)
Njegoskij Fund Network: Diplomatic clippings on the acquisition of Podgoricka Banka a.d.
Njegoskij Fund Network: Official report on the privatization of Podgoricka Banka a.d.
Njegoskij Fund Network: Podgoricka Banka will not suffer from the "Société Générale affair" in France

Banks of Montenegro
Banks established in 1906
Société Générale
1906 establishments in Montenegro
Croatia–France relations
Foreign relations of Croatia
Foreign relations of France